Neal Charles Hertweck (born November 22, 1931) is a retired American professional baseball player, a first baseman who appeared in two Major League games for the St. Louis Cardinals in .

Born in St. Louis, Hertweck attended Washington University and the University of Missouri. His professional career lasted for eight seasons (1949–56) with his only audition for the MLB Cardinals happening after the 1952 campaign, during which Hertweck appeared in 152 games for the Omaha Cardinals of the Class A Western League. He started two games at first base on September 27–28 and went hitless in six at bats against Bob Rush and Paul Minner of the Chicago Cubs. He reached base once on a walk.

References

External links

1931 births
Living people
Albany Cardinals players
Allentown Cardinals players
Baseball players from St. Louis
Columbus Cardinals players
Columbus Red Birds players
Denver Bears players
Houston Buffaloes players
Major League Baseball first basemen
Nashville Vols players
Omaha Cardinals players
Rochester Red Wings players
Savannah Redlegs players
St. Louis Cardinals players
Winston-Salem Cardinals players